Arthur Cowley  was a professional footballer who played for Huddersfield Town, Brentford and Aberdare Athletic.

References

1887 births
Year of death missing
Footballers from Hendon
English footballers
Association football midfielders
English Football League players
Brentford F.C. players
Huddersfield Town A.F.C. players
Aberdare Athletic F.C. players